The Lazio regional election of 1985 took place on 12 May 1985.

Events
Christian Democracy resulted the largest party, ahead of the Italian Communist Party. After the election Sebastiano Montali, a Socialist, formed a government which included Christian Democracy. In 1987 Montali was replaced by Bruno Landi, a former Socialist President, who led the Region until 1990.

Results

Source: Ministry of the Interior

Elections in Lazio
1985 elections in Italy